Balmain ferry wharf (also known as Thames Street ferry wharf) is located on Sydney Harbour serving the Sydney suburb of Balmain. The single wharf is served by First Fleet and RiverCat class ferries.

In September 2012, the wharf closed for a rebuild. The existing wharf was demolished and a new one opened in February 2013.

To the east of the wharf, lies Transdev Sydney Ferries' Balmain depot.

Wharves & services

References

External links

 Balmain Wharf at Transport for New South Wales (Archived 11 June 2019)
Balmain Wharf Local Area Map Transport for NSW

Ferry wharves in Sydney
Balmain, New South Wales